This is a list of winners and nominees of the Primetime Emmy Award for Outstanding Lead Actor in a Comedy Series. The award is presented to the best performance by a lead actor in a television comedy series. Beginning with the 18th Primetime Emmy Awards, leading actors in comedy have competed alone. However, these comedic performances included actors from miniseries, telefilms, and guest performers competing against main cast competitors. Such instances are marked below: 
 # – Indicates a performance in a Miniseries or Television film, prior to the category's creation
 § – Indicates a performance as a guest performer, prior to the category's creation

The 74th Primetime Emmy Awards are the first Emmys where there is no representation from any of the big four broadcast networks.

Winners and nominations

1950s

1960s

1970s

1980s

1990s

2000s

2010s

2020s

Programs with multiple awards

4 wins
 All in the Family
 Frasier
 The Big Bang Theory

3 wins
 3rd Rock from the Sun
 Get Smart
 The Odd Couple
 Family Ties
 Monk

2 wins
 30 Rock
 Barry
 The Defenders
 The Dick Van Dyke Show
 M*A*S*H
 Taxi
 Cheers
 Ted Lasso
 Transparent

Performers with multiple wins

4 wins
 Michael J. Fox (3 consecutive)
 Kelsey Grammer (2 consecutive)
 Carroll O'Connor (3 consecutive)
 Jim Parsons (2 consecutive twice)

3 wins
 Don Adams (consecutive)
 John Lithgow (2 consecutive)
 Tony Shalhoub (2 consecutive)
 Dick Van Dyke (2 consecutive)

2 wins
 Alan Alda
 Alec Baldwin (consecutive)
 Ted Danson
 Bill Hader (consecutive)
 Judd Hirsch
 Jack Klugman
 Richard Mulligan
 Jason Sudeikis (consecutive)
 Jeffrey Tambor (consecutive)

Programs with multiple nominations

11 nominations
 Cheers
 M*A*S*H

10 nominations
 Frasier
 The Odd Couple

8 nominations
 All in the Family
 Monk

7 nominations
 30 Rock
 Barney Miller
 Black-ish
 The Big Bang Theory
 Roseanne

6 nominations
 3rd Rock from the Sun
 Curb Your Enthusiasm
 Everybody Loves Raymond
 The Office
 Mad About You
 Shameless

5 nominations
 Benson
 The Larry Sanders Show
 Louie
 Seinfeld
 Taxi
 Two and a Half Men

4 nominations
 The Bob Cummings Show
 The Danny Thomas Show
 Episodes
 Family Affair
 Family Ties
 Friends
 Get Smart
 House of Lies
 The Phil Silvers Show
 Spin City
 Will & Grace

3 nominations
 Atlanta
 Barry
 Chico and the Man
 Coach
 The Dick Van Dyke Show
 Empty Nest
 Father Knows Best
 The Good Place
 Happy Days
 The Kominsky Method
 Newhart
 Night Court
 Sanford and Son
 Three's Company
 Transparent

2 nominations
 Arrested Development
 Black Monday
 The Bernie Mac Show
 Buffalo Bill
 Crazy Like a Fox
 The Defenders
 Dragnet
 Evening Shade
 Hennesey
 Hogan's Heroes
 The Jack Benny Program
 The Jackie Gleason Show
 The Last Man on Earth
 Master of None
 Naked City
 Only Murders in the Building
 Perry Mason
 Schitt's Creek
 Soap
 Ted Lasso
 The Wonder Years
 The Untouchables

Performers with multiple nominations

14 nominations
 Ted Danson*

11 nominations
 Alan Alda*
 Kelsey Grammer*

8 nominations
 Michael J. Fox*
 Carroll O'Connor*
 Tony Shalhoub*

7 nominations
 Anthony Anderson
 Alec Baldwin*
 John Goodman
 Matt LeBlanc
 Hal Linden

6 nominations
 Steve Carell
 Don Cheadle
 Larry David
 John Lithgow*
 William H. Macy
 Jim Parsons*
 Paul Reiser
 Ray Romano*

5 nominations
 Louis C.K.
 Robert Cummings
 Robert Guillaume*
 Judd Hirsch
 Jack Klugman
 Richard Mulligan
 Tony Randall*
 John Ritter*
 Jerry Seinfeld
 Garry Shandling

4 nominations
 Don Adams*
 Eric McCormack*
 Charlie Sheen
 Phil Silvers*
 Danny Thomas*

3 nominations
 Jack Albertson*
 Harry Anderson
 Dabney Coleman
 Michael Douglas
 Redd Foxx
 Jackie Gleason
 Donald Glover*
 Bill Hader*
 Brian Keith
 Craig T. Nelson*
 Bob Newhart
 Jeffrey Tambor*
 Dick Van Dyke*
 Henry Winkler
 Robert Young*

2 nominations
 Aziz Ansari
 Jason Bateman
 Jack Benny*
 Sid Caesar*
 Bob Crane
 Will Forte
 Ricky Gervais*
 Eugene Levy*
 Bernie Mac
 Burt Reynolds*
 Fred Savage
 Jason Sudeikis*
 Jack Warden

(*) refers to those who have won in this category

Superlatives

Total awards by network

 NBC – 26
 CBS – 19
 ABC – 11

 HBO/HBO Max – 3
 USA – 3
 Amazon – 2

 Apple TV+ – 2
 FX – 1
 Pop TV - 1

See also
 Primetime Emmy Award for Outstanding Lead Actress in a Comedy Series
 Primetime Emmy Award for Outstanding Lead Actor in a Drama Series
 Golden Globe Award for Best Actor – Television Series Musical or Comedy
 Screen Actors Guild Award for Outstanding Performance by a Male Actor in a Comedy Series

Notes

References

Lead Actor - Comedy Series
 
Emmy Award